In the mathematical study of partial differential equations, the Bateman transform is a method for solving the Laplace equation in four dimensions and wave equation in three by using a line integral of a holomorphic function in three complex variables.

The formula asserts that if ƒ is a holomorphic function of three complex variables, then

 

is a solution of the Laplace equation, which follows by differentiation under the integral.  Furthermore, Bateman asserted that the most general solution of the Laplace equation arises in this way.

References
 .
 .

Harmonic analysis
Integral geometry
Partial differential equations
Several complex variables